Theatre venues in North Carolina include:
In Charlotte
Actor's Theatre of Charlotte
Carolina Actors Studio Theatre
ImaginOn
Blumenthal Performing Arts Center
Theatre Charlotte
Charlotte Shakespeare
In Durham
Durham Performing Arts Center
In Flat Rock
Flat Rock Playhouse, the state theatre of North Carolina
In Hayesville
The Peacock Playhouse
In Murphy
Henn Theater
In Wilmington
Thalian Hall, opened 1858.
Hannah Block Second Street Stage.

See also
Theatre in the United States

References

North Carolina
Theaters